was a Japanese professional baseball player for the Hawks franchise (known during his career as the Nankai Hawks and the Fukuoka Daiei Hawks) and the Orix Braves. Celebrated for his slugging ability, he ate a lot and became a strong hitter, though was later weakened by diabetes mellitus. With 567 home runs, Kadota is number three on the NPB career list.

Kadota won the Nippon Professional Baseball Comeback Player of the Year Award in 1980 with 41 home runs and 84 RBI.

He hit 44 home runs at the age of 40 in 1988, also knocking in 125 runs and winning the Pacific League Most Valuable Player Award. That year he was also given the Matsutaro Shoriki Award, for contribution to the development of professional baseball.

After playing for the Orix Braves for two seasons, he returned to the Hawks in 1991; he retired after his last game against pitcher Hideo Nomo in 1992.

Kadota was inducted into the Japanese Baseball Hall of Fame in 2006.

See also
Nippon Professional Baseball Comeback Player of the Year Award

References

External links
 Hiromitsu Kadota (Japanese Baseball Hall of Fame)
 

1948 births
2023 deaths
Baseball people from Yamaguchi Prefecture
Fukuoka Daiei Hawks players
Fukuoka SoftBank Hawks players
Japanese Baseball Hall of Fame inductees
Japanese baseball players
Nankai Hawks players
Nippon Professional Baseball designated hitters
Nippon Professional Baseball MVP Award winners
Nippon Professional Baseball outfielders
Orix Braves players
Orix Buffaloes players